Przhevalsky (masculine), Przhevalskaya (feminine), or Przhevalskoye (neuter) is the name of several inhabited localities in Russia:
Przhevalskoye, an urban locality (a resort settlement) in Demidovsky District of Smolensk Oblast
Przhevalskaya, a rural locality (a railway station) in Pogranichny District of Primorsky Krai